Bror Andreasson (25 January 1887 – 15 October 1969) was a Swedish sports shooter. He competed in the 300 and 600 metre team military rifle event at the 1920 Summer Olympics.

References

External links
 

1887 births
1969 deaths
Swedish male sport shooters
Olympic shooters of Sweden
Shooters at the 1920 Summer Olympics
Sportspeople from Skåne County